Kolosnykove is an urban-type settlement in Makiivka Municipality (district) in Donetsk Oblast of eastern Ukraine. Population:

Demographics
Native language as of the Ukrainian Census of 2001:
 Ukrainian 18.62%
 Russian 80.23%
 Belarusian 0.16%

References

Urban-type settlements in Donetsk Raion